Romain Sassot (born 26 February 1986) is a French swimmer. He competed 4 × 100 metre medley relay event at the 2012 Summer Olympics.

References

External links
 

1986 births
Living people
French male backstroke swimmers
Olympic swimmers of France
Swimmers at the 2012 Summer Olympics
People from Saint-Rémy, Saône-et-Loire
Sportspeople from Saône-et-Loire